The Ronald Reagan Minuteman Missile State Historic Site consists of two former missile sites around Cooperstown, North Dakota that were part of North Dakota military activities during the Cold War years: the Oscar-Zero Missile Alert Facility  and the November-33 Launch Facility.  The site is operated by the State Historical Society of North Dakota.

The two facilities are the last of the 321st Missile Wing, a cluster of intercontinental ballistic missile launch sites that were spread over a  area around the Grand Forks Air Force Base. These facilities played a major part in how the United States responded to the training and testing of responding to a nuclear threat. The Oscar-Zero Site is the last launch control center intact for the public to visit, along with the top-side access to November 33 missile facility.

Visitors access the sites through guided tours of topside facilities to learn about daily life of the people who monitored the missiles, and also can tour the underground launch control operations.

See also
 List of museums in North Dakota
 Minuteman Missile National Historic Site
 Titan Missile Museum
 Strategic missile forces museum in Ukraine – Similar museum in the former Soviet Union

References

External links

Ronald Reagan Minuteman Missile State Historic Site - State Historical Society of North Dakota

Museums in Griggs County, North Dakota
Military and war museums in North Dakota
Cold War museums in the United States
North Dakota State Historic Sites
Nuclear missiles of the United States
Protected areas established in 2009
2009 establishments in North Dakota